Loakes Park was the home of Wycombe Wanderers Football Club from 1895 to 1990. It was located next to Wycombe General Hospital in the centre of High Wycombe, England. The ground was donated to the club by Frank Adams, a former Wanderers player who had bought the freehold on the ground from Lord Carrington in 1945.

The club's present ground, Adams Park, was named in honour of Frank Adams.

The most famous feature of the ground was the 11-foot slope across the pitch, running downhill from the main seated stand.

The record attendance was 15,850 for an FA Amateur Cup Fourth Round tie on Saturday 25 February 1950, when Wycombe Wanderers beat St Albans City 4–1. It remains to this day the highest attendance for a Wycombe Wanderers home fixture. The ground comprised a wooden seated main stand (holding around 1,000 people) along the top (south) side of the ground, a covered stand opposite this with shallow terracing (affectionately known as the "Cowshed"), and open terraces with crowd barriers at each end.

Arguably the most memorable match to be played at Loakes Park was in the FA Cup Third Round on Saturday 4 January 1975. At the time, Middlesbrough were near the top of the old Football League First Division (now the Premier League), and Wycombe (a non-league team at this time) held them to a 0–0 draw. The game was watched by 12,000 people.

During the final season at Loakes Park, 1989–90, Wycombe Wanderers were still playing in the GM Vauxhall Conference. Three years later they won promotion to the Football League.

The site of Loakes Park was redeveloped, partly as extra car parking for the nearby hospital, and partly as new housing.

When the club moved to its new Adams Park ground, the original gates from Loakes Park were transferred to the new stadium.

History

Loakes Park became the home of Wycombe Wanderers when their previous ground, Spring Meadow, was sold, thus making it unavailable for football. An approach was made to Lord Carrington, owner of the estate which included Loakes Park, for permission to play football there. Permission was granted, with the first match taking place on Saturday 7 September 1895 against Park Grove.

Wycombe Wanderers were left searching for a site for a new ground when the neighbouring Wycombe General Hospital first announced plans to expand onto the land that the ground was occupying in the early 1970s. Eventually a compulsory purchase order was placed on Loakes Park in the 1980s, however Wycombe Wanderers had difficulties obtaining planning permissions as nine proposals at various locations in High Wycombe were all dismissed by the local planning authority. Only after the Home Secretary had overturned the initial rejection of a proposed ground at the end of Hillbottom Road in the Sands district of High Wycombe, could Wycombe Wanderers begin work on their new ground in 1989, funded largely by the proceeds from the sale of Loakes Park. This was completed in time for the 1990–91 season, and was named Adams Park in honour of Frank Adams, who had purchased the freehold of Loakes Park and donated to the club in 1945.

References

Defunct football venues in England
Sports venues in Buckinghamshire
Sports venues completed in 1895